The pool stage of the 2007–08 Heineken Cup began on 9 November 2007, and was completed on 20 January 2008. Involved in the pool stage were the 23 clubs that qualified through their respective domestic leagues, and one that qualified via the Italo-Celtic play-off match in May 2007. The 24 teams were divided into six pools of four teams each, with each team to play each of the others in their pool once at home and once away. At the end of the pool stage, the winners of each pool advanced to the quarter-finals, along with the two best runners-up. The teams were then seeded, first by pool position, and then by points attained, in order to determine which teams received home advantage for the quarter-finals.

The draw for the pool stage took place on 20 June 2007 at Cardiff's Millennium Stadium.

The 2007–08 tournament was the first in which no team had yet secured a quarter-final place by the end of Round 5.

All times are local to the match venue.

Pool 1

Pool 2

Pool 3

Pool 4

Pool 5

Notes:
 Munster place above Clermont Auvergne by virtue of having earned more competition points in their two head-to-head matches: 6 to 4.

Pool 6

Seeding and runners-up
The winners of each of the six pools are seeded 1 to 6 first by points, then tries scored, and finally score difference. The runners-up are similarly sorted, and the best two are seeded seven and eight and progress to the quarter-finals alongside the six winners. The top four seeds are given home matches in the quarter-finals, with seed 1 playing seed 8, seed 2 playing seed 7 etc.

See also
 2007–08 Heineken Cup

References

External links
 European Rugby Cup : Pools

Pool Stage
2007-08